Borya sphaerocephala is a perennial herbaceous plant found in southwest Australia. A common name for the species is pincushions. The height is 20–200 millimetres, White flowers appear between August and October. The species is associated with the region's granite outcrops, occurring in depressions and seasonally wet areas, growing in crevices and at the edge of moss mats. As a resurrection plant it is able to withstand seasonal dehydration of its environ. The species was first described by Robert Brown, published in his 1810 work on Australian plants. A combination Baumgartenia sphaerocephala, currently regarded as synonym, was published by Kurt Sprengel several years after Brown.

References 

Boryaceae
Endemic flora of Southwest Australia
Taxa named by Robert Brown (botanist, born 1773)
Plants described in 1810